The discography of Lecrae, an American Christian hip hop artist, consists of 11 studio albums, two of which were collaborative; four mixtapes; two extended plays, one of which was collaborative; 110 singles, including 61 as a featured performer; 66 music videos, including 31 as a featured performer; and 86 guest and other appearances. Lecrae debuted with Real Talk in 2004 through Reach Records; the album was re-issued the following year by Cross Movement Records. After the Music Stops followed in 2006 and his third solo album, Rebel, was released in 2008 and reached No. 1 on the Gospel chart, the first Christian hip hop album to do so. Rehab, his fourth solo album, was released in 2010 and reached No. 1 on the Gospel, Christian, and Independent charts, and garnered a nomination at the 53rd Grammy Awards. Rehab: The Overdose, was released on January 11, 2011, and peaked at No. 1 on the Christian and Gospel charts. Lecrae began garnering mainstream attention when he performed at the 2011 BET Hip Hop Awards Cypher (a group free-style), and was featured on the Statik Selektah song "Live and Let Live" from his Population Control album.

On May 10, 2012, Lecrae released his first mixtape, Church Clothes, hosted by DJ Don Cannon. Considered his breakthrough into mainstream hip hop, the mixtape was downloaded over 100,000 times in less than 48 hours. The day before its release it was dubbed by the Houston Chronicle and the Christian hip hop website Da South "the most important album in Christian rap history." On September 4, 2012, Lecrae released his sixth studio album, Gravity, which debuted at No. 3 on the Billboard 200 and No. 1 on the Top Rap, Christian, Gospel, and Independent Albums charts. Gravity was also dubbed the most important album in Christian hip hop history. The album won the Grammy Award for Best Gospel Album at the 55th Grammy Awards. Anomaly was released September 9, 2014, debuting at No. 1 on the Billboard 200. It was certified gold by the Recording Industry Association of America (RIAA) in 2016. On September 22, 2017, he released All Things Work Together, and on June 22, 2018, he released Let the Trap Say Amen, a collaborative album with producer Zaytoven. Both albums reached No. 1  on the Christian chart. He released a tenth studio album, Restoration, on August 21, 2020. It also reached No. 1  on the Christian chart. A an eleventh album, a collaboration with 1K Phew entitled No Church in a While, was released on December 3, 2021. Lecrae's fourth mixtape, Church Clothes 4, was released on November 4, 2022. As of February 2020, he has sold over three million albums. Three of Lecrae's singles are certified gold by the RIAA: "All I Need Is You", from Anomaly, certified in 2018, "Blessings" (featuring Ty Dolla Sign), from All Things Work Together, certified in 2019, and "Coming In Hot" (with Andy Mineo), from the Summer Eighteen playlist and Mineo's album Neverland II, certified in 2021. The single "I'll Find You" (featuring Tori Kelly), from All Things Work Together, was certified platinum in 2019.

Studio albums
"—" denotes a recording that did not chart or was not released in that territory. Beginning in 2015, Billboard rendered most hip hop/rap albums ineligible for the Gospel charts.

EPs

Mixtapes
"—" denotes a recording that did not chart or was not released in that territory. Beginning in 2015, Billboard rendered most hip hop/rap albums ineligible for the Gospel charts.

Singles

As lead artist
"—" denotes a recording that did not chart or was not released in that territory. Beginning in 2015, Billboard rendered most hip hop/rap songs ineligible for the Gospel charts.

As featured artist
"—" denotes a recording that did not chart or was not released in that territory. Beginning in 2015, Billboard rendered most hip hop/rap songs ineligible for the Gospel charts.

Other charted songs
"—" denotes a recording that did not chart or was not released in that territory. Beginning in 2015, Billboard rendered most hip hop/rap songs ineligible for the Gospel charts.

Other appearances

Music videos

As lead artist

As featured artist

Notes

Additional charting

Video credits

References

Hip hop discographies
Discographies of American artists
Cross Movement Records
Christian music discographies
Discography